Proposition 8 (or Senate Constitutional Amendment No. 67) was an amendment of the Constitution of California relating to the assessment of property values. It was proposed by the California State Legislature and approved by voters in a referendum held on 7 November 1978.

The amendment was necessitated by the passage  of Proposition 13 in June of the same year. Proposition 8 allowed for a reassessment of real property values in a declining market. For this purpose it amended Article 13A of the state constitution, which had been added by Proposition 13. Today a reassessment based on a decline in market value is called a "Proposition 8" reassessment.

External links
  (excerpt on Proposition 8)
California Voters Pamphlet, November 1978 (in full)

1978 California ballot propositions
Taxation in California
1978